is a series of crossover fighting games developed and published by Capcom, featuring characters from their own video game franchises and comic book series published by Marvel Comics. The series originated as coin-operated arcade games, though later releases would be specifically developed for home consoles, handhelds, and personal computers.

Its gameplay borrows heavily from Capcom's previous Marvel-licensed fighting games X-Men: Children of the Atom and Marvel Super Heroes; however, instead of focusing on single combat, the games incorporated tag team battles. Players form teams of two or three characters and, controlling one fighter at a time, attempt to damage and knock out their opponents. Players can switch out their characters during the match, allowing team members to replenish their health and prolong their ability to fight. The series' gameplay is also distinguished from other fighting game franchises due to its character assist mechanics and emphasis on aerial combat.

The Marvel vs. Capcom series has received generally positive reviews from critics, who have praised its fast-paced gameplay, animated visuals, and wealth of playable characters. On the other hand, the games have been criticized for their lack of content, especially more recent installments. The series has enjoyed broad appeal, especially in markets outside of Japan, selling approximately  units .

Games

X-Men vs. Street Fighter was initially released as an arcade game in 1996. The game was later ported to the Sega Saturn in 1997 and PlayStation in 1998. It established the series' basic gameplay conventions by combining Street Fighter-style combat with tag team features. X-Men vs. Street Fighter also borrowed gameplay concepts from Capcom's previous Marvel-licensed fighting games, X-Men: Children of the Atom and Marvel Super Heroes.
Marvel Super Heroes vs. Street Fighter was released in arcades in 1997. It was then ported to the Sega Saturn in 1998 and PlayStation in 1999. The game expanded the playable roster to the larger Marvel Universe, introducing characters such as Captain America, Hulk, and Spider-Man. It was also responsible for introducing character assist moves to the franchise, a gameplay element which would influence future Marvel vs. Capcom installments.
Marvel vs. Capcom: Clash of Super Heroes debuted in arcades in 1998. Ports to the Dreamcast and PlayStation soon followed in 1999. Rather than strictly using Street Fighter characters, the game included characters from other Capcom video game franchises, such as Mega Man, Morrigan, and Strider Hiryu. It removed the character assist feature used in Marvel Super Heroes vs. Street Fighter and implemented its own system, which randomly allocated guest characters to each player.  
Marvel vs. Capcom 2: New Age of Heroes was released in arcades in 2000 and ported to the Dreamcast within the same year. The game received ports to the PlayStation 2 and Xbox in 2002. It was then re-released for the Xbox 360 and PlayStation 3 through the Xbox Live Arcade and PlayStation Network, respectively, in 2009. Lastly, a version for iOS devices was released in 2012. Featuring a large playable roster, Marvel vs. Capcom 2 reused the assist features from Marvel Super Heroes vs. Street Fighter and changed the series' two-on-two battle system to three-on-three fights. 
Marvel vs. Capcom 3: Fate of Two Worlds was released for PlayStation 3 and Xbox 360 in 2011. The series' traditional sprites transitioned into 3D character models while retaining the 2D-style combat. The game includes various gameplay features designed to make it more accessible to newer players, such as the additions of a comeback mechanic and a more simplified control scheme.
Ultimate Marvel vs. Capcom 3, a standalone updated edition of the original Marvel vs. Capcom 3, was released for PlayStation 3, PlayStation Vita, and Xbox 360 in 2011. The game was also released for the PlayStation 4 via the PlayStation Network in 2016; releases for the Xbox One via the Xbox Live Arcade and Microsoft Windows via Steam followed in 2017. It features new characters, stages, modes, and other enhancements to improve game balance and online functionality. 
Marvel vs. Capcom Origins, a compilation game which includes Marvel Super Heroes and Marvel vs. Capcom: Clash of Super Heroes, was released for the PlayStation 3 and Xbox 360 through the PlayStation Network and Xbox Live Arcade, respectively, in 2012. It features high-definition visuals, online multiplayer, dynamic challenges, and unlockables.
Marvel vs. Capcom: Infinite was released in 2017 for PlayStation 4, Xbox One, and Microsoft Windows. It features two-on-two battles, similar to earlier Marvel vs. Capcom games, and removes traditional assist moves in favor of its own dual-character combo system. The game also implements a gameplay mechanic involving the Infinity Stones, which grants players unique abilities and upgrades depending on the type of stone selected. It is the first game to feature a cinematic story mode.

Related media
In 2011, a series of Minimates based on the playable characters from Marvel vs. Capcom 3: Fate of Two Worlds were released by Art Asylum.

Udon Entertainment published Marvel vs. Capcom: Official Complete Works art book consisting of promotional artwork, sketches and bonus material from the video game collaborations between Marvel and Capcom, beginning with the 1993 arcade game The Punisher to Ultimate Marvel vs. Capcom 3. It contains contributions from a variety of artists and illustrators, including Akiman, Bengus, Shinkiro, Joe Madureira, Adi Granov, Joe Ng, Long Vo, Chamba, Adam Warren and Takeshi Miyazawa. Official Complete Works made its international debut at San Diego Comic-Con on July 11, 2012, in an exclusive hardcover edition. The hardcover also featured a wrap-around cover designed by Udon Entertainment and Capcom artist Alvin Lee, and digitally-painted by Udon's Genzoman. A standard-format softcover was released in November 2012 by Diamond Comics.

Within the Marvel Comics multiverse, the Marvel vs. Capcom universe is designated as "Earth-30847".

Gameplay

The basic gameplay of the Marvel vs. Capcom series was originally derived from X-Men: Children of the Atom and Marvel Super Heroes. Players compete in battle using characters with unique moves and special attacks. Using a combination of joystick movements and button presses, players must execute various moves to damage their opponent and deplete their life gauge, or alternatively, have the most cumulative health when the timer runs out. However, unlike the two aforementioned games, which focus on single combat, the Marvel vs. Capcom series revolve around tag team-based combat. Instead of choosing a single character, players select multiple characters to form teams of two or three. Each character on the team is given their own life gauge. Players control one character at a time, while the others await off-screen. Players are also free to swap between their characters at any point during the match. As characters take damage, portions of their life gauge will turn red, known as "red health", which represents the amount of health that a character can recover if the player tags them out. The off-screen, dormant characters will slowly replenish their red health, allowing players to cycle through their team members and prolong their ability to fight. Furthermore, as characters deal and receive damage, a colored meter at the bottom of the screen known as the "Hyper Combo Gauge" will gradually fill. By expending meter from their Hyper Combo Gauge, players can perform "Hyper Combos" – powerful, cinematic attacks that deal heavy damage to the opponent – in addition to several other special techniques. If one character loses all of their health, they are knocked out and the next available fighter will automatically come into play.

Each successive Marvel vs. Capcom installment has added, removed, or altered gameplay elements over the course of the series' history. X-Men vs. Street Fighter added two-on-two tag team features. Marvel Super Heroes vs. Street Fighter introduced the concept of the "assist" by allowing the player to summon their off-screen partner to perform a special move without switching characters. This feature was replaced in Marvel vs. Capcom: Clash of Super Heroes, which instead randomly allocated an unplayable guest character with a preset assist move before each match; in addition, assists were limited to only a few uses per round. The assist features from Marvel Super Heroes vs. Street Fighter were re-incorporated into the following sequel, Marvel vs. Capcom 2: New Age of Heroes, once again granting players the ability to call in their off-screen characters at any time during the match without constraint. Marvel vs. Capcom 2 also increased the number of characters per team by one, providing a three-on-three battle format. Marvel vs. Capcom 3: Fate of Two Worlds introduced "X-Factor", a comeback mechanic which offers increased damage, speed, and red health regeneration for a limited time upon activation. Marvel vs. Capcom: Infinite reverts to two-on-two partner battles and removes traditional character assists. Infinite also implements the Infinity Stones as a gameplay mechanic, where each of the six stones grants unique abilities and enhancements to the player.

Another gameplay element that helps to distinguish the Marvel vs. Capcom series from other fighting game franchises is its emphasis on aerial combat. Every character in the Marvel vs. Capcom series is given a "Launcher" move, which sends the opponent flying up into the air. The player can then choose to follow up immediately by using a "Super Jump", which allows a character to jump much higher than normal, in order to continue their combo; these airborne combos are called "Air Combos" or "Aerial Raves". Marvel vs. Capcom 3 introduced a gameplay feature known as the "Team Aerial Combo" or "Aerial Exchange", giving players the opportunity to extend their Air Combos further by quickly tagging in their other characters while mid-air.

As Capcom's design philosophy for the series has changed to appeal to a wider audience, the control scheme has been repeatedly modified to accommodate people less familiar with the fighting game genre. The first three installments utilized the same layout of six attack buttons, separated as three pairs of light, medium, and hard punches and kicks. In Marvel vs. Capcom 2, in order to make the game more accessible, the layout was tweaked to four attack buttons, consisting of two pairs of light and heavy punches and kicks, and two dedicated assist buttons. The control scheme was further simplified with the release of Marvel vs. Capcom 3, which included three attack buttons designated to undefined light, medium, and hard attacks, two assist buttons, and an "exchange button" used to perform Launchers and switch between characters during Air Combos. In addition, Marvel vs. Capcom 3 included two different control scheme options: Normal Mode and Simple Mode. Simple Mode, designed for casual players, allows players to perform special moves and Hyper Combos with single button presses at the expense of limiting a character's available moveset.

Characters
Marvel vs. Capcom has featured over 100 playable fighters, primarily drawn from comic book series published by Marvel Comics and video games franchises developed and produced by Capcom. The games have introduced a few original characters, which include Norimaro from Marvel Super Heroes vs. Street Fighter, and Amingo, Ruby Heart, and SonSon from Marvel vs. Capcom 2: New Age of Heroes. In addition to the playable cast, other characters from the Marvel and Capcom universes make appearances in the games in varying capacities. Both Marvel Super Heroes vs. Street Fighter and Marvel vs. Capcom: Clash of Super Heroes include secret characters which can be played by inputting specific sequences of joystick movements on the character select screen. These secret characters consist of palette swaps of existing fighters with different moveset properties. Clash of Super Heroes also has unplayable summon characters as part of its "Guest Character/Special Partner" assist system.

Many Marvel vs. Capcom installments also allow players to fight as the games' boss characters in special game modes, with the exception of Abyss from Marvel vs. Capcom 2. Characters that have not been playable frequently make cameo appearances in the games' cutscenes and stage backgrounds. Lastly, numerous non-playable Marvel and Capcom characters are featured as "Ability Cards" in the Heroes and Heralds game mode in Ultimate Marvel vs. Capcom 3. Out of all the playable characters, Ryu and Chun-Li are the only ones to have appeared in every game released thus far.

Notes

History

Capcom's partnership with Marvel Comics began in 1993 with the release of The Punisher, an arcade beat 'em up based on the comic book series of the same name. Capcom then created their first Marvel-licensed fighting game, X-Men: Children of the Atom, in 1994. Marvel Super Heroes soon followed in 1995. Many of the gameplay mechanics used in the Marvel vs. Capcom series were first developed and refined in these two fighting games, serving as precursors to the series. In 2011, then-current Capcom USA Strategic Marketing Director of Online and Community Seth Killian stated that many fighting game aficionados, including himself, consider them to have laid the foundation for the series.

The idea for implementing tag teams was allegedly inspired by an easter egg from Capcom's own 1995 fighting game Street Fighter Alpha: Warriors' Dreams. In a secret "Dramatic Battle" mode, two players, controlling Ryu and Ken, were able to fight against an AI-controlled M. Bison at the same time. The easter egg itself had drawn inspiration from the final battle sequence from Street Fighter II: The Animated Movie, which featured a similar fight scene. Recognizing the uniqueness of a team-up concept, Capcom began to work on their next project. After their earlier licensing ventures with Children of the Atom and Marvel Super Heroes, the company decided to combine Marvel's X-Men franchise, their own Street Fighter franchise, and their team-up concept, leading to the creation of X-Men vs. Street Fighter. The game debuted in Japanese arcades in 1996, establishing the series' fast-paced, tag team-based gameplay style.

Marvel Super Heroes vs. Street Fighter was then released in 1997, which replaced most of the X-Men cast with other heroes from the Marvel Universe and introduced the character assist mechanic. Marvel vs. Capcom: Clash of Super Heroes later followed in 1998, exchanging the majority of the Street Fighter cast with characters from other Capcom video games series, such as Mega Man and Darkstalkers. In 1999, Capcom announced the development of yet another sequel, called Marvel vs. Capcom 2: New Age of Heroes. Marvel vs. Capcom 2 heavily re-used assets from previous Capcom-developed games, including Street Fighter Alpha, Darkstalkers, and the earlier Marvel vs. Capcom titles, resulting in a large roster of 56 playable characters. Shortly after the release of the PlayStation 2 and Xbox ports for Marvel vs. Capcom 2, Capcom lost the use of the Marvel license, putting the series on an indefinite hiatus. However, with the resurgence of 2D fighting games in 2008, owing to the success of Street Fighter IV, Marvel requested Capcom to collaborate with them once again. Capcom would announce the development of the next installment in the Marvel vs. Capcom series, Marvel vs. Capcom 3: Fate of Two Worlds, in 2010. The game was eventually released in 2011. An updated version of Marvel vs. Capcom 3, titled Ultimate Marvel vs. Capcom 3, was released later in the same year. The high-definition compilation game Marvel vs. Capcom Origins was then released in 2012.

Following the release of Ultimate Marvel vs. Capcom 3 for the PlayStation Vita in 2012, Marvel's new parent company, The Walt Disney Company, which acquired Marvel in 2009, chose not to renew Capcom's license with the Marvel characters, instead opting to put them in its own self-published Disney Infinity series. As a result, Capcom had to pull both Ultimate Marvel vs. Capcom 3 and Marvel vs. Capcom 2 off their online platforms in 2013. However, in 2016, Disney announced its decision to cancel the Disney Infinity series, discontinue self-publishing efforts, and switch to a licensing-only model, allowing them to license their characters to third-party game developers, including Capcom. Marvel vs. Capcom: Infinite was revealed in 2016, and then released in 2017.

Reception

The Marvel vs. Capcom series has received reviews ranging from average to positive from critics. According to Capcom President and COO Haruhiro Tsujimoto, the games have enjoyed broad appeal, especially in markets outside of Japan. ,  units of the series have been sold, making it Capcom's seventh best-selling franchise.

The series' first three titles, X-Men vs. Street Fighter, Marvel Super Heroes vs. Street Fighter, and Marvel vs. Capcom: Clash of Super Heroes, received praise for their frantic gameplay style, visual flair, playable character rosters, and the quality of their sprite animations. The games' Dreamcast and Sega Saturn ports were also lauded for their technical performance, matching the capabilities of the arcade versions. Conversely, the PlayStation ports were criticized for their removal of tag team battles and noticeable decline in frame rate and animation quality – changes which stemmed from the console's RAM limitations.

Marvel vs. Capcom 2: New Age of Heroes received similar praise, with particular attention given towards the large cast and the addition of three-on-three combat. The Dreamcast, PlayStation 2, and Xbox versions were criticized for their lack of online multiplayer support outside Japan. These concerns were addressed with the release of the PlayStation 3 and Xbox 360 ports, which reviewers commended for their smooth online experience. A common source of complaints was the game's jazz-inspired soundtrack, which critics deemed as out of place.

In addition to its character variety and visual presentation, Marvel vs. Capcom 3: Fate of Two Worlds garnered praise for simplifying the series' combat mechanics and control scheme, thus making it more accessible for players new to fighting games. Ultimate Marvel vs. Capcom was applauded for its additions to the character roster, gameplay tweaks, and improved online functionality. Both games, however, were criticized for their lack of game modes and single-player content. Marvel vs. Capcom Origins was praised for preserving the original arcade releases' integrity and its addition of online multiplayer, dynamic challenges, and unlockable content; however, in remaining faithful to the arcade versions, some reviewers criticized the games for their outdated gameplay and unbalanced fighters. Marvel vs. Capcom: Infinite received mixed to positive reviews, with critics praising its implementation of new gameplay mechanics, such as the "Active Switch" combo system and the addition of the six Infinity Stones. On the other hand, the game was criticized for its presentation, particularly its art direction, and its character roster.

In 2012, Complex ranked Marvel vs. Capcom at number 37 on the list of the best video game franchises, commenting that "a frenetic pace and over the top effects work together to make this franchise stand the test of time".

References 
Notes

Footnotes

External links 
 - Arcade version

 
Arcade video games
Street Fighter
Fighting games
2D fighting games
2.5D fighting games
Video game franchises
Video game franchises introduced in 1996
Video games developed in Japan